The 2019 IWBF Men's European Championship was the 24th edition of the European Wheelchair Basketball Championship held in Wałbrzych, Poland  from 28 August to 9 September 2019.

Squads
Each of the 12 teams selected a squad of 12 players for the tournament.

Athletes are given an eight-level-score specific to wheelchair basketball, ranging from 0.5 to 4.5. Lower scores represent a higher degree of disability. The sum score of all players on the court cannot exceed 14.

Preliminary round
All times local (UTC+02:00)

Group A

Group B

Knockout stage

Brackets
9th–12th place semifinals

Quarter-finals

5th–8th place semifinals

9th–12th place semifinals

11th place

9th place

Quarter-finals

5th–8th place semifinals

7th place

5th place

Semi-finals

3rd place

Final

Final standings

References

European Wheelchair Basketball Championship
2019 in wheelchair basketball
2018–19 in Polish basketball
2018–19 in European basketball
International basketball competitions hosted by Poland
Wheelchair basketball in Poland
Sport in Wałbrzych
August 2019 sports events in Europe
September 2019 sports events in Europe